SQL Buddy is an open-source web-based application written in PHP intended to handle the administration of MySQL and SQLite with the use of a web browser. The project places an emphasis on ease of installation and a simple user interface.

Development of SQL Buddy has stopped, with version 1.3.3 released on January 18, 2011.

References

Web applications
Free software programmed in PHP
MySQL